240-Robert is an American drama series that ran on ABC from August 28, 1979, to March 21, 1981. The series title is a reference to the call-sign designation for the Los Angeles Sheriff's Department's search and rescue/paramedic teams. The series is considered lost, due to the lack of home video releases of the show except for a few VHS releases in Europe. Only a small number of extremely bad quality Spanish dub clips of the show and the intro of the English version is available online. There are also some VHS episodes of 240-Robert available for viewing on the website archive.org.

Synopsis
The series chronicles the missions of "240-Robert", a specialized unit of the Los Angeles County Sheriff's Department (LASD), that utilized four wheel drive vehicles and a helicopter.  Most of the assignments were sea/air/land search and rescue operations in the extensive (over ) jurisdiction.  The show's creator was Rick Rosner (himself an LASD reserve deputy), who created the hit series CHiPs two years earlier for NBC.

The vehicles used at that time were 1979 Ford Broncos, while the helicopter was a Hughes HA-500C (similar in design to the current MD 500).

The series was based on real life cases encountered by the LASD's Emergency Services Detail. The real life ESD is actually headquartered in East Los Angeles. Rick Rosner took artistic liberty and portrayed the headquarters as a beach-side station. The actual filming location was at a State of California ranger station located at Sycamore Cove in Ventura County, California. The series was inspired, in part, on the experiences of Officer Charles Thibaudeau of the Hermosa Beach Police Department.

Cast
 John Bennett Perry . . . Deputy Theodore Roosevelt "Trap" Applegate III
 Mark Harmon . . . Deputy Dwayne "Thib" Thibideaux (episodes 1–13)
 Joanna Cassidy . . . Deputy Morgan Wainwright (episodes 1–13), the unit's helicopter pilot
 Stephen W. Burns . . . Deputy Brett Cueva (episodes 14–16), who replaced Thib
 Pamela Hensley . . . Deputy Sandy Harper (episodes 14–16), the new pilot of the unit

Cassidy and Hensley both had an expert helicopter pilot take over for them in the actual helicopter flight sequences; this regular stunt pilot was Charles 'Chuck' Tamburro who wore a wig to give the appearance of a female pilot.

Cancellation

Harmon and Cassidy left the series when their contracts expired after the first season. Burns and Hensley were brought in to replace them, but the second season (returning mid-season in early 1981 due to an actor's strike) only lasted three episodes before ABC cancelled it due to poor ratings.

Episode list

Season 1 (1979)

Season 2 (1981)

References

External links
 
 
 www.240-ROBERT.com
 https://archive.org at archive.org

1979 American television series debuts
1981 American television series endings
1970s American drama television series
1980s American drama television series
1970s American police procedural television series
1980s American police procedural television series
American Broadcasting Company original programming
English-language television shows
Television series by MGM Television
Television shows set in Los Angeles
Television series by Filmways